Maldives competed at the 2013 World Aquatics Championships in Barcelona, Spain between 19 July and 4 August 2013.

Swimming

Maldivian swimmers achieved qualifying standards in the following events (up to a maximum of 2 swimmers in each event at the A-standard entry time, and 1 at the B-standard):

Men

Women

References

External links
Barcelona 2013 Official Site
Swimming Association of Maldives web site

Nations at the 2013 World Aquatics Championships
2013 in Maldivian sport
Maldives at the World Aquatics Championships